The Uyunid Emirate was an emirate centered in al-Hasa that ruled Eastern Arabia and Najd at its greatest extent. The emirate was ruled by the Uyunid dynasty, an Arab dynasty from the tribe of Banu Abd al-Qays. The emirate was established in 1076 after the Uyunids took over control from the Qarmatians and was ended in 1253 when it was overthrown by the Usfurids.

History

Expansion 
Under Muhammad b. Ahmad b. Abu'l-Hussin b. Abu Sinan, the Uyunid's territory stretched from Najd to the Syrian desert. Due to the influence of the Uyunid Emirate, Caliph al-Nasir li-Din Allah gave Muhammad b. Ahmad authority to protect the pilgrimage route to Mecca. Muhammad was later murdered by a family member, instigated by his cousin, Gharir b. Shukr b. Ali. In the years 587 – 605 H. Mohammed bin Abi Al-hussain unites Qatif and Al-Hasa.

Geography

The country was mainly Bahrain (historical region) in the east of the Arabian Peninsula. It stretched from the south of Basra along the Persian Gulf coast and included the regions of Kuwait, al-Hasa, Qatif, Qatar, and the Awal Islands, now known as Bahrain, UAE and to the edges of Oman. The Uyunid's territory stretched from Najd to the Syrian desert. Due to the influence of the Uyunid Emirate, Caliph al-Nasir li-Din Allah gave Muhammad b. Ahmad authority to protect the pilgrimage route to Mecca.

The Uyunid dynasty were an Arab dynasty that ruled Uyunid Emirate for almost 200 years, from the 11th to the 13th centuries. They were the remnants of Bani Abdul Qays tribe and seized the country from the Qarmatians with the military assistance of Great Seljuq Empire in the year 1077–1078 AD.

Military 
The Uyunid dynasty had a great Military system alongside the Seljuq Empire.

Economy

The Uyunids Economy consisted of pearl diving. The pearl industry had been the main economic activity of Uyunid Emarite alongside the Trade routes.

Demographics

Language 
It was thought that the Uyunid dynasty were the last country in which the population spoke Classical Arabic.

Religion 
The Uyunids sect mention that they were Shia, and According to Nakash, the populations of Bahrain, Hasa, and Qatif, may have accepted Twelver Shi'ism during this period. and Over all the population living within the emirate were mostly Muslim, however there were two different sects within it; Sunni and Shi'a.

Culture

Literature 
Ali bin al Mugrab Al Uyuni, a poet from al-Hasa, died in 630 AH (1232 AD), one of the late known poets specialists hair systems eloquent among the people of the Arabian Peninsula before the modern era. Percentage due to Al Uyuni built from Abdul Qays, who ruled Ahsa in that period after extracted from Qarmatians. Al Uyuni poet, and is considered his office and explanations which are attached by one of the most important sources on the history of that state.

Architecture 
The Khamis Mosque is believed to be the first mosque in Bahrain, built during the era of the Umayyad caliph Umar II. According to Al Wasat journalist Kassim Hussain, other sources mention that it was built in a later era during the rule of Uyunids with one minaret. The second was built two centuries later during the rule of Usfurids. The identical twin minarets of this ancient Islamic monument make it easily noticeable as one drives along the Shaikh Salman Road in Khamis.

It is considered to be one of the oldest mosques in the region, as its foundation is believed to have been laid as early as 692 AD. An inscription found on the site, however, suggests a foundation date of sometime during the 11th century. It has since been rebuilt twice in both the 14th and 15th centuries, when the minarets were constructed. The Khamis mosque has been partially restored recently.

See also
 Qatif
 Bahrain 
 List of Muslim empires and dynasties

References

 Gulf and east of the Arabian Peninsula named: the territory of the country of Bahrain under the rule of the Arab states. D. Mohamed Mahmoud Khalil. Madbouli library . I: 2006. 
 Abdelkader Statistical: masterpiece beneficiary on Ahsa in the old and the new, the achievement Hamad Al-Jasser Riyadh 1960.

Sources

Former countries in the Middle East
Former empires
Uyunid dynasty
Arab dynasties